John Steven "Pip" Doheny (born December 17, 1953), is a jazz tenor saxophonist and band leader, who also plays flute, clarinet, and alto saxophone.

Born in Seattle, Washington, Doheny studied with prominent Canadian saxophonist and bandleader Fraser MacPherson, whom he credits as a major influence. He spent his early career in the 1970s primarily in Vancouver, British Columbia, Canada, playing in local rhythm and blues bands and strip clubs, as well as spending large parts of each year on exhaustive road trips to taverns throughout rural British Columbia and Alberta. By the late 1970s and into the mid 1980s he was appearing as a sideman with artists such as Albert Collins, Doug and the Slugs, the Coasters, the Platters, the Temptations, and Buddy Knox. In the late 1980s he relocated to Toronto, Ontario, Canada, and then New York City, working with the bands of Lloyd Williams, Solomon Burke, Danny B, and Kenny Margolis.  The 1990s saw Doheny doing extensive touring and studio work, both with jazz ensembles and pop groups, including Bell Biv Devoe.

He released his first CD as a leader One Up, Two Back  in 2002, featuring his band the John Doheny Quintet, and vocalist Colleen Savage. In 2003 he relocated to New Orleans to pursue a master's degree in jazz history at Tulane University.

Doheny is noted as a colorful raconteur (no small accomplishment in a city like New Orleans).  A 2002 interview with him can be found here, courtesy of smoothjazz.com, which includes an explanation of how he came to acquire the middle name "Pip", and an account of his early days as a struggling musician.

Doheny is also a jazz historian. He holds an MA in Jazz History from Tulane University, as well as a B.mus and B.ed from the University of British Columbia in Vancouver, British Columbia, Canada. He has written articles on Jelly Roll Morton in the popular press, and published in Tulane's Jazz Archivist. He has also achieved notoriety for transcribing the music of Charles Mingus from audio form into written musical scores. Having transcribed the music of Mingus, he adapted the scores to a series of performances entitled 'Mingus Mania,' parts of which appeared on the Bravo television network in the early 1990s as musical interludes. Doheny also composed and performed source music for the soundtrack for the 1998 Bruce Sweeney film Dirty, as well as appearing with his band in the 1997 Brian Dennehy TV movie A Father's Betrayal.

He is now a resident of New Orleans, Louisiana.  While many New Orleans residents were displaced by Hurricane Katrina, Doheny was one of the first to return after the flood waters subsided, and was one of the most enthusiastic and vocal advocates for the rebuilding of New Orleans to its original form, history, and traditions.

Discography

As leader

The Real Cool Killers: Parades and Saints-Independent − 2010

John Doheny (tenor saxophone)
Geoff Clapp (drums)
Rob Kohler (bass)

Parades and Saints
In the Hive
Cuts and Courts
1963
The Split
For Booker Ervin
The Matrix is Not Real
Brother Brown
Cissy Takes a Train
Slightly Stella
Rhythm-a-ning

John Doheny presents The Professors of Pleasure, Volume Two-Independent − 2010

John Doheny (tenor and soprano saxophone)
Jim Markway (acoustic and electric bass)
Geoff Clapp (drums)− 
Jesse McBride (acoustic and electric piano)
John Dobry (electric guitar)
Allen L. Dejan Jr. (alto, tenor and soprano saxophone)
Andrew Baham (trumpet)

Don't Know About That
Child Playing
Half Nelson
Nancy with the Laughing Face
Funky B
Beautiful Old Ladies
Elysian Fields
Cautious Optimism
This I Dig of You
Tulane Fight Song

John Doheny and The Professors of Pleasure: Tulane University Faculty Quintet − Independent 2007

John Doheny (tenor and alto saxophone)
Fredrick Sanders (piano, Fender Rhodes electric piano, Hammond B-3 organ)
John Dobry (guitar)
Jim Markway (electric and acoustic bass)
Kevin O'Day (drums)

Jackson Square
Padrino
Cottontail
Your Majesty
The Rainbow People
A Greasy One
Halifax
Big G's Love

One Up, Two Back - JDQ Records CD618551 − 2002

John Doheny (tenor sax)
Norm Quinn (trumpet and flugelhorn) 
Ridley Vinson or Tony Foster (piano)
Al Johnston (bass) 
Stan Taylor (drums) 
Colleen Savage (vocals)

One Up, Two Back
We Knew
Attack of the Killer Chalmations
Player's Inn
Dindi
Killer Chalmations . . Slight Return
Time After Time
Once in a While
Perdido

Appears on the following recordings

Algiers-Colleen Savage-Savage Records (2011)
Hot Air Volume 3. CBC Radio Compilation. CBC Records. HACD0052 (2002)
Martin Ferr - Dubious - Independent Cassette - 001 (1995)
Bell Biv Devoe Poison (Bell Biv DeVoe album)-MCA Records (1990)
Terraced Garden - Within - Melody And Menace Records LP - CT - 1960 (1988)
Downtown Kenny Brown and the Pervaders - Willin' and Ready - Razor Records/Blue Wave Records LP - 017 (1982)
Albert Collins - When The Welfare Turns Its Back On You - Sonnet Records - LP - 14107 (1979)
Douglas College Night Band - It's Just Talk-CD- DC 1007 (1998)
VCC Jazz Orchestra - Revelation-Cassette (1995)
VCC Jazz Orchestra - Let Me Off Uptown-Cassette (1993)

Original compositions, "If I Only Had A Brain" and "Uncle Jim's Blues", to the soundtrack of the 1998 Bruce Sweeney film Dirty

External links 
 
Biography at vancouverjazz.com
Article at Tulane University

1953 births
Living people
American jazz composers
American male jazz composers
Jazz musicians from New Orleans
American jazz tenor saxophonists
American male saxophonists
Musicians from Seattle
21st-century American historians
American male non-fiction writers
Tulane University alumni
21st-century American saxophonists
21st-century American male musicians
Historians from Washington (state)
Historians from Louisiana
21st-century American male writers